In number theory, the Lagarias arithmetic derivative or number derivative is a function defined for integers, based on prime factorization, by analogy with the product rule for the derivative of a function that is used in mathematical analysis.

There are many versions of "arithmetic derivatives", including the one discussed in this article (the Lagarias arithmetic derivative), such as Ihara's arithmetic derivative and Buium's arithmetic derivatives.

Early history
The arithmetic derivative was introduced by Spanish mathematician Josè Mingot Shelly in 1911. The arithmetic derivative also appeared in the 1950 Putnam Competition.

Definition
For natural numbers , the arithmetic derivative  is defined as follows:

 .
  for any prime .
  for any  (Leibniz rule).

Extensions beyond natural numbers

Edward J. Barbeau extended the domain to all integers by showing that the choice , which uniquely extends the domain to the integers, is consistent with the product formula. Barbeau also further extended it to the rational numbers, showing that the familiar quotient rule gives a well-defined derivative on :

Victor Ufnarovski and Bo Åhlander expanded it to the irrationals that can be written as the product of primes raised to arbitrary rational powers, allowing expressions like  to be computed. 

The arithmetic derivative can also be extended to any unique factorization domain (UFD), such as the Gaussian integers and the Eisenstein integers, and its associated field of fractions. If the UFD is a polynomial ring, then the arithmetic derivative is the same as the derivation over said polynomial ring. For example, the regular derivative is the arithmetic derivative for the rings of univariate real and complex polynomial and rational functions, which can be proven using the fundamental theorem of algebra. 

The arithmetic derivative has also been extended to the ring of integers modulo n.

Elementary properties

The power rule is also valid for the arithmetic derivative. For any integers  and :

This allows one to compute the derivative from the prime factorization of an integer, :

For example: 

or

The sequence of number derivatives for  begins :

Related functions
The logarithmic derivative 
 is a totally additive function: 

An arithmetic function  is Leibniz-additive if there is a totally multiplicative function  such that

The function  given in Section 3.5 of the book by Sandor and Atanassov is, in fact, exactly the same as the usual arithmetic derivative .

Inequalities and bounds
E. J. Barbeau examined bounds on the arithmetic derivative and found that
 
and

In both bounds above, equality always occurs when  is a power of 2.

Dahl, Olsson and Loiko found the arithmetic derivative of natural numbers is bounded by
 

Order of the average
We have 

and

for any δ > 0, where

Relevance to number theory

Victor Ufnarovski and Bo Åhlander have detailed the function's connection to famous number-theoretic conjectures like the twin prime conjecture, the prime triples conjecture, and Goldbach's conjecture. For example, Goldbach's conjecture would imply, for each  the existence of an  so that .

See also
Arithmetic function
Derivation (differential algebra)
p-derivation

Notes

References

 
 
Arithmetic Derivative, Planet Math, accessed 04:15, 9 April 2008 (UTC)
 L. Westrick (2003). Investigations of the Number Derivative.
 Peterson, I. Math Trek: Deriving the Structure of Numbers.
 
 Dahl N., Olsson J., Loiko A., Investigation of the properties of the arithmetic derivative.

 

 
 
 
 
 
 
 
 
 

Additive functions
Arithmetic functions
Number theory
Generalizations of the derivative